Simone Paolo Puleo (born 2 November 1979) is an Italian footballer who plays as a defender for Seconda Divisione club Avellino.

Career
Born in Milan, Lombardy, Puleo started his career at A.C. Milan. he then left for Serie C2 club Solbiatese Arno, and then left for Serie C1 club Foggia in co-ownership deal. In 2000 Milan bought back Puleo. Milan re-sold Puleo to Avellino in August 2000. He followed the team promoted to Serie B in 2003 as Serie C1 champion. After Avellino relegated in 2004, he followed the team promoted to Serie B again 2005 as playoff winner. He was loaned to fellow Serie B team Crotone in January 2006. Avellino relegated again in 2006 and promoted again in 2007 as playoff winner. In January 2008, after 6 months without any league appearance for Avellino, he left for Monza.

In September 2009, he terminated the contract with Monza and returned to Avellino for its Serie D campaign. In 2010–11 season, Avellino admitted to Seconda Divisione as numbers of club quit professional football.

Honours
Avellino
Serie C1: 2003

References

External links
 Avellino Profile 
 Football.it Profile 
 LaSerieD.com Profile 

Italian footballers
Serie B players
A.C. Milan players
Calcio Foggia 1920 players
U.S. Avellino 1912 players
F.C. Crotone players
A.C. Monza players
Association football defenders
Footballers from Milan
1979 births
Living people